Takal is the biggest village in Choha Khalsa Union Council of Kallar Syedan Tehsil, Rawalpindi District of Punjab, Pakistan. Nearby towns are Bewal and Choha Khalsa. The village named after a Sikh – Tikka Lal Singh. Its located in between Gujar Khan and Kaller Saydan.

Places of interest 
 Sangni Fort

Schools in Takal 
 Government Boys Middle School TAKKAL, CHOA KHALSA, KALLAR SYEDAN

Villages in Choha Khalsa Union Council
Populated places in Kallar Syedan Tehsil